Econochrist was an American political hardcore punk band active in the late 1980s and early 1990s.  They moved from Arkansas to the San Francisco Bay Area to become part of the punk music scene there.  The group was composed of singer Ben Sizemore, aka Ben Econochrist, drummer Markley Hart, guitarist Jon Sumrall, and bassist Mike Scott.

Discography 
It Runs Deep 7" (1988, Truant Records)
Ruination LP (1990, Very Small Records)
The Detonators/Econochrist split EP with The Detonators (1991, Insurrection Records)
Another Victim 7" (1991, Vermiform Records)
Trained to Serve LP (1992, Vermiform Records)
Skewed 7" (1993, Ebullition Records)
Econochrist 2xCD collection of the band's work – (Ebullition Records)

Compilation appearances 
Bombpop 9" flexi (1990, A Day Late and a Dollar Short Records)
What Are You Pointing At? 10" (1989, Very Small Records)
Give Me Back (1991, Ebullition Records)
Very Small World 2xLP (1991, Very Small Records)

References 
Liner notes of Econochrist 2-CD collection released on Ebullition Records.

External links 
Official MySpace profile
Ebullition Records Catalog: Econochrist The band's releases on Ebullition
Everything2 – Econochrist biography
Pressure's On Ben Sizemore's show on KMBT Radio

1988 establishments in Arkansas
1993 disestablishments in California
Hardcore punk groups from California
Musical groups disestablished in 1993
Musical groups established in 1988